The 2014–15 New Hampshire Wildcats men's ice hockey team represented the University of New Hampshire during the 2014–15 NCAA Division I men's ice hockey season. The team was coached by Dick Umile, in his 25th season with the Wildcats. The Wildcats played their home games at the Whittemore Center on campus in Durham, New Hampshire, competing in Hockey East.

Previous season
In 2013–14, the Wildcats finished 4th in Hockey East with a record of 21–17–1, 11–9–0 in conference play. In the 2014 Hockey East Men's Ice Hockey Tournament, they lost in the championship to UMass Lowell, by a score of 4–0. They failed to qualify for the 2014 NCAA Division I Men's Ice Hockey Tournament.

Personnel

Roster
As of December 26, 2014.

Coaching staff

Standings

Schedule

|-
!colspan=12 style=""| Exhibition

|-
!colspan=12 style=""| Regular Season

|-
!colspan=12 style=""| Postseason

Rankings

References

New Hampshire Wildcats men's ice hockey seasons
New Hampshire Wildcats
New Hampshire Wildcats
New Ham
New Ham